Active thermography is an advanced nondestructive testing procedure, which uses a thermography measurement of a tested material thermal response after its external excitation. This principle can be used also for non-contact infrared non-destructive testing (IRNDT) of materials. 

The IRNDT method is based on an excitation of a tested material by an external source, which brings some energy to the material. Halogen lamps, flash-lamps, ultrasonic horn or other sources can be used as the excitation source for the IRNDT. The excitation causes a tested material thermal response, which is measured by an infrared camera. It is possible to obtain information about the tested material surface and sub-surface defects or material inhomogeneities by using a suitable combination of excitation source, excitation procedure, infrared camera and evaluation method.

Modern thermographic systems with high-speed and high-sensitivity IR cameras extend the possibilities of the inspection method. Modularity of the systems allows their usage for research and development applications as well as in modern industrial production lines.

Thermovision nondestructive testing of components can be carried out on a wide range of various materials. Thermographic inspection of material can be regarded as a method of infrared defectoscopy, that is capable of revealing material imperfections such as cracks, defects, voids, cavities and other inhomogeneities. The thermographic testing can be provided on individual components in a laboratory or directly on technology facilities that are in duty.

Introduction to infrared thermography 
Infrared (IR) thermography is an analysis technique based on the detection of radiation in the IR part of the electromagnetic spectrum. According to the black body radiation law, all objects with temperature greater than absolute zero emit IR radiation. The device detecting and composing a 2D image of the IR radiation is generally called an IR camera or a thermographic camera, also referred to as an infrared camera. The result of the thermographic recording is an image or a sequence, which corresponds to the intensity of the thermal radiation of the recorded object. The recording is called a thermogram. The intensity of the thermal radiation of the object is directly connected with the object temperature. The thermogram is therefore an image of the object surface temperature distribution. IR thermography is in the most cases used for non-contact measurement of spatial and time distribution of temperature fields.

Properties 
IR thermography has a number of advantages – it is non-contact measurement, it captures an area (similarly to the classical video camera in visible spectrum) or it can measure moving or rotating objects, even if the objects have a very high temperature. However, the IR radiation intensity detected by the infrared camera does not depend solely on the measured object temperature. 

The main drawback of IR thermography is the fact that the result is influenced by a number of factors such as the thermo-optical properties of the object (emissivity, transmissivity, reflectivity), ambient temperature, environment properties, etc. Especially the knowledge of the measured object optical properties are fundamental for an accurate temperature measurement. Determination of these properties is often a complicated task and it requires both experience and the appropriate equipment.

Classification 
Thermography can be classified as qualitative or quantitative, and passive or active. Qualitative thermography usually does not require an accurate temperature measurement. It only evaluates temperature differences between particular components, between different spots on the same object or between the measured object and the background. Qualitative thermography has many important applications, for example a thermal leaks diagnostics, thermal components diagnostics, searching for persons or in medicine. In contrast, the goal of quantitative thermography is an accurate temperature measurement of inspected objects. Knowledge of thermo-optical properties of the measured objects is essential in this case. Moreover, the thermo-optical properties often depend on temperature and it is also necessary to take into account an influence of environment.

Important applications of quantitative thermography include temperature monitoring during thermal processing or determination of thermal boundary conditions for numerical simulations of thermal processes.

Both the qualitative and quantitative approaches can be applied in terms of passive or active thermography. If the object temperature is not artificially affected during its measuring, it is called the passive thermography. If an artificial excitation using an external source is applied on the measured object, it is called active thermography. The external excitation causes temperature contrasts associated with material inhomogeneities or defects occurrence or it can be used for material properties identification. The active thermography is the important technique used for finding defects in materials, so called infrared non-destructive testing (IRNDT). Active thermography can be also applied for material thermal properties determination.

Infrared non-destructive testing (IRNDT)

Active thermography 

Active thermography uses an external source for measured object excitation, that means introducing an energy into the object. The excitation sources can be classified by the principles:

 optical radiation or microwaves absorption,
 electromagnetic induction,
 elastic waves transformation (e.g. ultrasound),
 convection (e.g. hot air),
 plastic deformation transformation (thermoplastic effect during mechanical loading).

Various excitation sources can be used for the active thermography and nondestructive testing, for example laser heating, flash lamps, halogen lamps, electrical heating, ultrasonic horn, eddy currents, microwaves, and others. The measured object can be heated by an external source directly, e.g. by halogen lamps or hot air. The material inhomogeneities or defects cause then a distortion of temperature field. This distortion is detected as temperature differences on the material surface. Another possibility is to use thermophysical processes in the material, when mechanical or electrical energy is transformed into thermal energy due to defects and inhomogeneities. It creates local temperature sources, which cause temperature differences detected on the object surface by infrared techniques. It is the case of ultrasound excitation for example.

IRNDT methods 
A lot of methods were developed for active thermography for the nondestructive testing measurement evaluation. The evaluation methods selection depends on application, used excitation source and excitation type (pulse, periodic, continuous). In the simplest case, the response is evident from a thermogram directly. However, it is necessary to use advanced analysis techniques in most cases. The most common methods include Lock-In, Pulse or Transient (Step thermography) evaluation techniques. Continuous excitation can also be used in some cases.

 Lock-In thermography (periodic excitation method). A modulated periodic source is used for the excitation. The phase and amplitude shift of the measured signal are evaluated and the analysis can be done by various techniques. Halogen lamps, LED lamps, ultrasound excitation or an electric current are suitable excitation sources. It has the advantage that it can be used on large surfaces and it puts a low thermal energy on the part being inspected. The disadvantage is a longer measurement time and dependence of detection capabilities on a geometrical orientation of defects (except of an indirect excitation such as ultrasound). The Lock-In method is suitable for testing components with a low thermal diffusivity and it has many modifications for various specific applications (such as Lock-In Ref, Lock-In Online, etc.).
 Pulse thermography (pulse method). A very short pulse – usually in the units of milliseconds – is used to excite the object. The cooling process is then analyzed. A flash lamp is typically used as an excitation source. The advantage of this method is the speed of the analysis and a possibility to estimate the defects depth. The disadvantage is a limited depth of the analysis, a limited area that can be inspected (with regard to a usable power of excitation sources) and a dependence of detection capabilities on geometrical orientation of defects.
 Transient thermography (step thermography, thermal wave method). In principle, the excitation and evaluation are similar to the pulse thermography, however, the pulse length is much bigger. Less powerful excitation sources are required compared to the pulse thermography. It is therefore possible to analyze larger areas and the measurement time is shorter than in the case of Lock-In thermography. As in the pulse thermography, the sensitivity of the method is limited by the geometrical orientation of defects. Halogen lamps are the suitable excitation source for this type of evaluation.
 Continual excitation. The simplest method usable only in special applications.

A high-speed cooled infrared camera with a high sensitivity is commonly used for IRNDT applications. However, an uncooled bolometric infrared camera can be used for specific applications. It can significantly reduce acquisition costs of the measurement system.

The IR nondestructive testing system are usually modular. It means that various excitation sources can be combined with various infrared cameras and various evaluation methods depending on application, tested material, measuring time demands, size of a tested area, etc. The modularity allows universal usage of the system for various industrial, scientific and research applications.

Application examples 
IRNDT (infra-red nondestructive testing) method is suitable for detection and inspection of cracks, defects, cavities, voids and inhomogeneities in material, it is also possible to use the method for inspection of welded joints of metal and plastic parts, inspection of solar cells and solar panels, determination of internal structure of material etc.

The main advantage of IRNDT method is availability for inspection of various materials in wide range of industrial and research applications. IRNDT measurement is fast, nondestructive and noncontact. Restrictive condition for IRNDT method is inspection depth combined with dimension and orientation of defect/crack/inhomogeneity in material.

Pulse IRNDT analysis of a demonstration sample 

The demonstration and calibration sample is made of carbon fiber-epoxy composite. There are six holes of different depths on one side to simulate defects at different depths in range from 1 to 4 mm under the surface. The IRNDT analysis is performed from the flat side.

The results from the flash-pulse analysis show that the holes appear in different time frames of the evaluation – according to their depth. So the flash-pulse analysis does not only detect the presence of defects but also determine their depth under the surface if a thermal diffusivity of the sample is known.

Inspection of laser welded plastic parts 

Laser welding of plastics is a progressive technology of connecting materials with different optical properties. Classical methods for testing of welding performance and weld joints quality – such as the metallographic cut microscopic analysis or X-ray tomography – are not suitable for routine measurements. Pulse IRNDT analysis can be successfully used for weld inspection in many cases.

The images show an example of plastic parts inspection with a defective weld and with a correct weld. The gaps in the defective weld and the correct uninterrupted weld line are both well visible in the results of the IRNDT flash-pulse analysis.

Inspection of laser welded joints 

Laser beam welding is a modern technology of fusion welding. Currently finds its wide usage not only in the field of scientific research but also establishes itself in a variety of industries. Among the most frequent users belong the automotive industry, which due to its stable continuous innovation enables fast implementation of advanced technologies in their production. It is clear that laser welding significantly enhances engineering designs and thus brings a number of new products which previously could not be made by conventional methods.

The laser welding can produce quality welds of different types, both extremely thin and thick blanks. Weldable are common carbon steels, stainless steels, aluminum and its alloys, copper, titanium and last but not least, special materials and its combinations.

An integral part of the weldments production is a quality control. Unlike conventional non-destructive test methods, IRNDT is used not only after the laser welding process, but also during it. This makes possible to decide whether or not to the weldment comply with established quality criteria during manufacture process.

References

External links 
 Active thermography and IR non-destructive testing, University of West Bohemia, New Technologies - Research Centre, department Thermomechanics of Technological Processes

Materials science